Notre-Dame Saint-Sigisbert is a private Catholic school in Nancy, France run in cooperation with the state. It was ranked 10th in excellence out of 48 schools in  2006 by the magazine L'Étudiant.

The school was established in 1881 from the earlier House of Students, which had been founded in 1864 by Bishop Charles Martial Lavigerie.)

Sister schools
Saint-Sigisbert has three sister schools in three European countries:
 United Kingdom – Mount St Mary's College
 Italy – Scuola Enrico Fermi à Padoue
 Germany – Gymnase Johanneum de Hombourg

Famous alumni
Louis Marin, politician
Eugène Tisserant, cardinal
Pierre Schaeffer, composer
François Guillaume, politician
François Chérèque, trade unionist
Jean-Philippe Jaworski, writer
Johann Vexo, organist

References

External links
 official website 
 Alumni Association Notre-Dame Saint-Sigisbert 
 Alumni Association of The Malgrange – Saint-Sigisbert

Schools in Nancy, France
Educational institutions established in 1842